Trollfest (stylized as TrollfesT) are a Norwegian folk metal band.

The band released their first full-length album, Willkommen Folk Tell Drekka Fest, on the Solistitium Records label on 15 March 2005. The album name translates roughly to "Welcome Folk to the Drinking Feast" in English. Their second album, Brakebein (2006), was released by Omvina on 24 May 2006.  The band performed at the 2007 Barther Metal Openair festival in Germany, which was their first-ever live appearance; in 2008 they played at the pagan metal Ragnarök Festival. On 10 January 2022, the band were announced as an act in Melodi Grand Prix 2022 with the song "Dance Like a Pink Flamingo".

History
Trollfest was formed in 2003 by John Espen Sagstad (Mr.Seidel) and Jostein Austvik (Trollmannen). Their first album Willkommen Folk Tell Drekka Fest!! was released in 2005, and the band followed up with the second album Brakebein in 2006.

During the first years, Trollfest never played live, and the first foray beyond the planning stage occurred in 2007 as one of the headlining bands at the Ninth Barther Metal Open Air Festival.  TrollfesT then went on to headline and play various festivals and concerts around Europe during 2007–08, including the Ragnarök and Riedfest festivals. From October to November 2012, the band went on tour with Wintersun, Korpiklaani, Krampus and Varg for Heidenfest 2012 tour.

Trollfest's third studio album, Villanden, was published in January 2009. In 2011 Trollfest signed with NoiseArt Records, and later that year En Kvest For Den Hellige Gral, the band's fourth studio album, was released. Trollfest announced their new album, Brumlebassen, which came out 24 August 2012. The band's sixth studio album Kaptein Kaos was released in April 2014. Following the release of Kaptein Kaos the band embarked on their first European headliner tour.

Their seventh studio album, Helluva was released in 2017.

On 10 January 2022, it was announced that TrollfesT is one of the acts competing in Melodi Grand Prix 2022 with the song "Dance Like a Pink Flamingo".

Band members

Current members
 Jostein "Trollmannen" Austvik – vocals 
 John "Mr. Seidel" Sagstad – guitars 
 Eirik "Trollbank" Renton – drums, bouzouki 
 Dag "Drekka Dag" Stiberg – saxophone 
 Alexander "Böesse Basshöl" Bøe – bass 
 Kai "Fjernkontrollet" Renton – accordion, keyboards 
 Fabian "Fabio Grimdrap" Jiru – guitars 
 Bjørn "Kjellkjé" Rønnow – drums

Former members
 Martin "Psychotroll" Storm-Olsen – bass 
 Øyvind Manskow – accordion, banjo 
 Per Spelemann – guitars 
 Morten "Dr. Leif Kjønnsfleis" Müller – guitars, vocals 
 Tor "St. Beinhard" Rogn – guitars 
 Øyvind "Lodd Bolt" Johannesen – bass

Timeline

Musical style
Most of Trollfest's lyrics are written in the fictional Trollspråk, which is a mixture of Norwegian and German. The band is also known for their use of saxophones and accordions in their songs. They describe their own music as Balkan metal.

Discography

Studio albums
 Willkommen Folk Tell Drekka Fest! (2005)
 Brakebein (2006)
 Villanden (2009)
 En Kvest For Den Hellige Gral (2011)
 Brumlebassen (2012)
 Kaptein Kaos (2014)
 Helluva (2017)
 Norwegian Fairytales (2019)
 Flamingo Overlord (2022)

EPs
 Uraltes Elemente (2009)
 Happy Heroes (2021)

Gallery

References

External links
Web site: http://www.trollfest.com

Norwegian folk metal musical groups
Musical groups established in 2003
2003 establishments in Norway
Musical groups from Oslo